Al Ahli Club has a professional beach soccer team based in Dubai.

Mundialito de Clubes 2012 squad

Coach:  Talib Hilal

Honours

International competitions
Mundialito de Clubes
 Group Stage: 2012

Beach soccer clubs